There have been four baronetcies created for persons with the surname Barlow, one in the Baronetage of England and three in the Baronetage of the United Kingdom.

The Barlow Baronetcy, of Slebetch in the County of Pembroke, was created in the Baronetage of England on 13 July 1677 for John Barlow. He was succeeded by his son, the second Baronet. He represented Cardigan Boroughs and Haverfordwest in the House of Commons. The title became extinct on the death of his son, the third Baronet, sometime after 1756.Records in the National Archives refer to a will of Sir George Barlow BT. dated 1792 concerning property in Scartho, Lincolnshire.

The Barlow Baronetcy, of Fort William in Bengal, was created in the Baronetage of the United Kingdom on 29 June 1803 for George Barlow. He was Provisional Governor-General of India from 1805 to 1807 and Governor of Madras from 1807 to 1813. He was succeeded by his son, the second Baronet. He was a Judge of the Supreme Court of Calcutta. His line of the family failed on the death of his unmarried son, the third Baronet, in 1889. The late Baronet was succeeded by his first cousin, the fourth Baronet. He was the son of Richard Wellesley Barlow, younger son of the first Baronet. His grandson, the fifth Baronet, was a Colonel in the Royal Artillery. As of 2007 the title is held by the latter's grandson, the seventh Baronet, who succeeded his father in 1946.

The Barlow Baronetcy, of Wimpole Street in St Marylebone in the County of London, was created in the Baronetage of the United Kingdom on 20 February 1902 for the physician Thomas Barlow. He was succeeded by his eldest son Alan Barlow, the second Baronet, who was a prominent civil servant. Commodore Sir Thomas Erasmus Barlow, DSC DT took the title in 1968. On his death in 2003 the title was passed to the fourth Baronet, Sir James Alan Barlow.

The Barlow Baronetcy, of Bradwall Hall in Sandbach in the County of Chester, was created in the Baronetage of the United Kingdom on 20 July 1907 for John Barlow. He was a successful businessman and also represented Frome in the House of Commons as a Liberal. He was succeeded by his eldest son, the second Baronet. He sat as Member of Parliament for Eddisbury and Middleton and Prestwich. As of 2022 the title is held by his grandson, the fourth Baronet, who succeeded in that year. The third baronet was High Sheriff of Cheshire in 1979.

Barlow baronets, of Slebetch (1677)

Sir John Barlow, 1st Baronet (c. 1652-c. 1695) High Sheriff of Pembrokeshire, 1680
Sir George Barlow, 2nd Baronet (c. 1680-c. 1726)
Sir George Barlow, 3rd Baronet (died after 1756)

Barlow baronets, of Fort William (1803)
Sir George Hilaro Barlow, 1st Baronet (1762–1846)
Sir Robert Barlow, 2nd Baronet (1797–1857)
Sir Morison Barlow, 3rd Baronet (1835–1889)
Sir Richard Wellesley Barlow, 4th Baronet (1836–1904)
Sir Hilaro William Wellesley Barlow, 5th Baronet (1861–1941)
Sir Richard Hugh Barlow, 6th Baronet (1904–1946)
Sir Christopher Hilaro Barlow, 7th Baronet (1929–2022)
Sir Crispian John Edmund Audley Barlow, 8th Baronet (born 1958) 

The heir apparent to the baronetcy is Peter Stephen Barlow (born 1961), first cousin of the 8th Baronet.

Barlow baronets, of Wimpole Street (1902)

Sir Thomas Barlow, 1st Baronet (1845–1945)
Sir (James) Alan Noel Barlow, 2nd Baronet (1881–1968)
Sir Thomas Erasmus Barlow, 3rd Baronet (1914–2003)
Sir James Alan Barlow, 4th Baronet (born 1956)

The heir presumptive to the baronetcy is Philip Thomas Barlow (born 1960), 2nd and youngest son of the 3rd Baronet.

His heir apparent is his only son, Joshua Samuel Barlow (born 1996).

Barlow baronets, of Bradwall Hall (1907)

Sir John Emmott Barlow, 1st Baronet (1857–1932)
Sir John Denman Barlow, 2nd Baronet (1898–1986)
Sir John Kemp Barlow, 3rd Baronet (1934–2022)
Sir John William Marshall Barlow, 4th Baronet (born 1964)

The heir apparent to the baronetcy is the current holder's only son, John William Oakley Barlow (born 1993).

References

Kidd, Charles, Williamson, David (editors). Debrett's Peerage and Baronetage (1990 edition). New York: St Martin's Press, 1990.

http://www.sussex.ac.uk/press_office/bulletin/28nov03/article20.shtml
https://groups.google.com/group/alt.obituaries/browse_frm/thread/264b3eeecfa2b359/718ea727ce367891?lnk=st

Baronetcies in the Baronetage of the United Kingdom
Extinct baronetcies in the Baronetage of England
1677 establishments in England